Alexandra Socha (born April 10, 1990) is an American actress who made her Broadway debut in the rock musical Spring Awakening in May 2008. Other notable stage appearances include Nora in the brief 2009 revival of Brighton Beach Memoirs, Daisy Fenton in the Off-Broadway run of Death Takes a Holiday, as Philoclea in Head Over Heels. She was featured in a supporting role in the Amazon  comedy TV series Red Oaks.

Biography
Socha was born in Nashua, New Hampshire, where she grew up, the daughter of Joan Storey and Thad Socha. As an only child, she performed with her parents in local community theater shows. She attended Nashua High South graduating in 2008.  Socha began to act as a child, joining the Peacock Players of Nashua, where she played Amneris in the musical Aida in 2006.  She gained professional experience with the American Stage Festival and The Lyric Stage.

After completing her junior year of high school, Socha made her Broadway debut in Spring Awakening on July 24, 2007. She replaced Krysta Rodriguez as an ensemble member plus understudying the roles of Wendla, Thea, Anna and Martha.  On May 20, 2008, Socha replaced Lea Michele taking over the role of Wendla fulltime. She received positive notices in the Daily News and The New York Times. She played out the remainder of the run, and also graduated from Nashua High School in 2008 after completing a home study program. Her next Broadway appearance was the short-lived revival of Brighton Beach Memoirs, which opened on October 25, 2009.

In September 2010, Socha was at the Yale Repertory Theater in "We Have Always Lived In The Castle," a new musical based on the Shirley Jackson novel of the same title. In April 2011, Socha opened in The Dream of the Burning Boy, at the Roundabout Theater Company's Black Box Theater. On July 14, 2011, she opened as Daisy Fenton in Death Takes a Holiday, at the Laura Pels theater. On November 28, 2011, Socha made her solo concert debut at Duplex Cabaret Theatre in New York City with a show entitled Home.

On October 17, 2012, Socha played Medium Alison in a workshop of the musical Fun Home, at the Public Theater in New York. From Sept. 30 – Dec. 1, 2013, Socha originated the role of Medium Alison in the official off-Broadway premiere of Fun Home at The Public Theater in New York. She left the show due to personal reasons and was replaced by understudy Emily Skeggs who continued with the remainder of the run and later transferred the show to Broadway.

Her television work includes the character Mia in the Showtime series The Big C, single appearances on White Collar, A Gifted Man, Made in Jersey, Law And Order: SVU, and a recurring role in the FX series Damages. She was a regular in Seasons 1 and 2 in the Amazon Comedy TV series Red Oaks.

In the Summer of 2017, Socha returned to the Theater stage originating the role of "Amber" in the world premiere of Anna Ziegler's play Actually. The show had its world premiere at the Williamstown Theatre Festival in Williamstown, Massachusetts. She continued with the show when it transferred Off Broadway to Manhattan Theatre Club's Stage II at New York City Center.

In 2018, Socha returned to Broadway for the first time in 8 years originating the role of Philoclea in Head Over Heels, a musical retelling of Sir Philip Sidney's play The Arcadia featuring music of The Go-Go's. For this show, Socha reunited with original Spring Awakening director Michael Mayer and castmate Andrew Durand. Head Over Heels had its world premiere in San Francisco, California at the Curran Theatre from April 10 - May 6, 2018. It officially arrived on Broadway at the Hudson Theatre in the Fall of that same year. Previews began June 23, 2018 and Opening Night was set for July 26, 2018. Socha stayed with the production during its entire Broadway run. The show closed on January 6, 2019.

On October 16, 2020, Socha revealed on Instagram, that she and Etai Benson had married in an intimate ceremony "weeks" back.

Filmography

Film

Television

Theater

References

External links 

Living people
American stage actresses
American musical theatre actresses
1990 births
People from Nashua, New Hampshire
Actresses from New Hampshire
21st-century American women